The Zambia national cricket team is the team that represents the Republic of Zambia in international cricket. It is administered by the Zambia Cricket Union, which became an associate member of the International Cricket Council (ICC) in 2003. The team made its international debut in 1930, during the country's colonial period as Northern Rhodesia.

Regular matches against other East African sides began in the 1950s, and Zambia contributed players to the combined East African cricket team that was an ICC member in its own right for much of the remainder of the 20th century (later transformed into the East and Central Africa Cricket Conference).

From the late 1990s onward, Zambia has been a regular participant in ICC Africa tournaments, although it has generally played in the lower divisions. The team has been promoted into the World Cricket League structure only once, placing fourth at the 2010 Division Eight tournament.

In April 2018, the ICC decided to grant full Twenty20 International (T20I) status to all its members. Therefore, all Twenty20 matches played between Zambia and other ICC members after 1 January 2019 were eligible to have full T20I status. ICC terminated Zambia's membership due to "continued non-compliance" to amend multiple breaches of the ICC's Membership Criteria in 2021 ICC AGM.

History

Beginnings

Then Northern Rhodesia, cricket was introduced into Zambia from neighbouring Zimbabwe (then Southern Rhodesia), in the early 1900s. With the number of the British settlers relatively low compared to Southern Rhodesia, cricket was slow to develop.

Despite the slow rate of development, the MCC travelled to Livingstone in December 1930 during their tour of South Africa, easily beating Northern Rhodesia by 9 wickets in their first international. By the late 1930s, cricket in Northern Rhodesia was being integrated with cricket in Southern Rhodesia, though it was rare to see players from the North playing for Rhodesia.

First formal organisation

After World War II, cricket was more formally organised with the formation of the Northern Rhodesia Cricket Union, and in 1948 an annual series of matches was begun against Southern Rhodesia. This lasted only until 1954 as the Southern Rhodesia side were much too strong to make any sort of decent contest. The North won only once, in 1952. One match was drawn and the other five all went the way of the South.

With the formation of the Federation of Rhodesia and Nyasaland in 1954, cricket was fully integrated with Southern Rhodesia but investment was concentrated around Harare and Bulawayo, meaning that cricket began to decline in the country. Nevertheless, a team was still organised to play Australia in October 1957 to start off the Australians tour of South Africa. Australia scored 302/6 declared in their innings and Richie Benaud took 9/16 as the home team were dismissed for 85 in their first innings, but they managed to hold out for a draw in the two-day match.

No further matches were played by Northern Rhodesia, but Rhodesia did play two first-class matches at Ek Park, Kitwe in 1962, one against an International XI and one against a Commonwealth XI.

Zambia starts play

With Zambia gaining independence in 1964, cricket began a resurgence. Whereas previously representative cricket had been confined to the white population due to Rhodesian cricket's links with apartheid South Africa, this separation meant the non-white population was now allowed to take part.

The Zambian Cricket Union was formed almost immediately and multi-racial cricket began. Zambia took part in East African regional tournaments with Kenya, Tanzania and Uganda in 1968, playing their first match as Zambia against Kenya in Nairobi in September 1968. For instance, the 1975 Quadrangular was played in Kampala, sadly with rain spoiling much of the schedule, the scorecard from Zambia v Kenya 1975 and the Zambian team photograph from that tour to Uganda.

The 1970s were the most successful period for Zambian cricket, as the country became a favoured destination for English sides. Gloucestershire toured in 1971, Glamorgan in 1972, the MCC in 1974 and Warwickshire in 1977. 

However, in the early 1980s the government began to invest less money in sport and with athletics and soccer being of more interest, cricket was a lower priority. A combined Minor Counties side toured in 1982, but this was the last match played by the national side until the mid-1990s, though some Zambian players played as part of the East African cricket team and East and Central African cricket team.

Modern era

By the mid-1990s, cricket was confined almost entirely to Lusaka, but the national side returned to play in the African Cricket Association Championships in 1994. Zambia took part in the Africa Cup in 2002, beating Namibia and Tanzania and the Zambian Cricket Union became an associate member of the ICC in 2003, enabling the national side to take part in ICC tournaments for the first time.

Zambia hosted the African Cricket Association Championship in 2004, the tournament being part of the qualification process for the 2005 ICC Trophy in Ireland. Zambia finished third behind Namibia and Uganda, qualifying them for the repêchage tournament. This tournament took place in Kuala Lumpur in February 2005 and Zambia finished eighth and last after losing to Italy in the seventh place play-off.

Zambia finished fourth in the World Cricket League Africa Region Division Two tournament in 2006, beating only Nigeria and did better in the same tournament in 2008 when they finished third behind Botswana and Nigeria. In 2010, they went better once again, winning the tournament. This then granted them entry into the 2010 ICC World Cricket League Division Eight.

Tournament history

ICC World Cricket League

2010 Division Eight-:4th place

ICC Trophy

 1979–1986: Did not participate – not an ICC member.
 1990–2001: See East and Central African cricket team.
 2005–present: Did not qualify.
 2009: Did not qualify 
 2014: Did not qualify 
 2018:Did not qualify

World Cricket League Africa Region

2006: 4th place (Division Two)
2008: 3rd place (Division Two)
2010: 1st place (Division Two)

Records

One-day
Below is a record of international matches played in the one-day format by Zambia between 2004 and 2017.

Team and individual records 
Highest team total: 449/5 declared v Uganda, 1969
Highest individual score: 183 by B Vashee v Uganda, 1969
Best bowling: 7/76 by RC Wilson v Kenya, 1968

Notable players

The following players played for Northern Rhodesia/Zambia and also played representative cricket including first-class, List A cricket or minor counties:

Keith W Arnold – played for East Africa. 
Derek Bruorton – played for Transvaal.
Aubrey Dennis – played for North Eastern Transvaal.
Chris English – played for Berkshire County Cricket Club
Roger Henderson – played for Rhodesia.
Wally Hitzeroth – played for Eastern Province and Rhodesia.
Bernard Horton – played for Rhodesia.
Michael Lee – played for Rhodesia and Western Province.
Hamish McLeod – played for East Africa.
Parbhu Nana – played for East Africa.
Majid Pandor – played for East Africa.
Yusuf Patel – played for East Africa.
CD Patel – played for East Africa.
Bimal Soni – played for Rajasthan.
Peter Stimpson – played for Worcestershire.
Jackie Ward – played for Transvaal and Rhodesia.
Yunus Badat – played for East Africa.

See also

History of cricket in Rhodesia and Zimbabwe to 1992
East African cricket team
East and Central African cricket team
 Details About Zambia and His team Players at Official ZambiaCricket.Org

References

Cricket in Zambia
National cricket teams
Cricket
Zambia in international cricket
1930 establishments in the British Empire